Jebal As-Seqaa (Arabic: جبال السقى) is a mountain at 18°13′05″N 42°23′51″E in the Sarwat Mountains of Saudi Arabia, in the region of Asir Belkrb near the city of Abha .  At a height of 2863 m (9393 ft) it is the  sixth highest mountain in Saudi Arabia.

Jebal As-Seqaa means  mount of Watering.

References

Seqaa
Geology of Saudi Arabia
Volcanism of Saudi Arabia